Doleromima hypoxantha is a moth of the family Depressariidae. It is found in Australia, where it has been recorded from New South Wales, Victoria and Tasmania.

The wingspan is about 20 mm.

References

Depressariinae